Loikaw University is a university situated in Loikaw Township, Kayah State, Myanmar.

History 

In 2014, along with other Burmese universities, the Loikaw university engaged in research to preserve the Thanlwin river. The department of geology also uncovered two trilobite species from the Taungnyo area dating back to the carboniferous.

See also 
List of universities in Myanmar

References 

Universities and colleges in Myanmar
Kayah State